Worcester City Council is the local authority for Worcester, a non-metropolitan district with city status in Worcestershire, England. The council consists of 35 councillors, elected from 15 wards.

History

The city of Worcester was an ancient borough which had held city status from time immemorial. The city became a municipal borough in 1836. When elected county councils were established in 1889, the city of Worcester was considered large enough to run its own county-level services and so it became a county borough, independent from the surrounding Worcestershire County Council. In 1974, under the Local Government Act 1972, the city had its territory enlarged, gaining the parishes of Warndon and St Peter the Great County and becoming a non-metropolitan district, with Hereford and Worcester County Council providing county-level services. Hereford and Worcester was abolished in 1998, since when a re-established Worcestershire County Council has been the upper-tier authority for Worcester.

Composition
The council has been under no overall control since the 2022 election, with the Conservatives the largest party. The leader of the council since 2018 has been Marc Bayliss, a Conservative. Following the 2022 election his title was changed to "joint leader", with provision made for Labour as the second largest party to also propose a joint leader. In the event they chose not to do so, and so the other joint leader position stands vacant. The next election is due in 2023.

Premises
The city council is based at Worcester Guildhall on the High Street in the city centre. The current guildhall was built in 1723 on a site which had been occupied by a guildhall since about 1227.

See also
List of mayors of Worcester

References

Non-metropolitan district councils of England
Local authorities in Worcestershire
City Council